General Instrument or General Instruments is part of a company name. It may refer to:

 General Instrument Inc.: Founded in 1939, in Montgomery County, Pennsylvania, United States; it was a manufacturer of diodes, transistors, and logic ICs
 General Instrument Corp.: The largest split-up portions from its predecessor, it was known as NextLevel Systems Inc., before 1998
 Texas Instruments Inc., whose original chosen name in 1951 was General Instruments Inc, before realizing that it was a name conflict
 On December 19, 2012, Arris International announced that it would acquire Motorola Mobility's home unit (the former General Instrument company) from Google